is a Japanese manga series written and illustrated by Nao Sasaki. It began serialization on Shueisha's Shōnen Jump+ manga website in November 2020. As of November 2022, the series' individual chapters have been collected into six volumes.

Publication
Written and illustrated by Nao Sasaki, the series began serialization on the Shōnen Jump+ manga website on November 25, 2020. As of November 2022, the series' individual chapters have been collected into six tankōbon volumes.

The series is being published in English by Shueisha's Manga Plus service. The series is also licensed in France by Kana and in Italy by Panini Comics.

Volume list

Reception
In the 2021 Next Manga Award, the series ranked 17th in the web manga category. It was also nominated for the same award in 2022.

References

External links
  
 Manga Plus page
 

Adventure anime and manga
Fantasy anime and manga
Japanese webcomics
Shōnen manga
Shueisha manga
Webcomics in print